Judd Legum (born December 8, 1978) is an American journalist, lawyer, and political staffer.

Early life 
Legum was born in Annapolis, Maryland. Legum earned a Bachelor of Arts in Public Policy analysis from Pomona College and a Juris Doctor from Georgetown University Law Center in 2003. After graduating from law school, Legum became a member of the Maryland State Bar Association.

Career 
Legum founded ThinkProgress in 2005, running it for two years before leaving in 2007 to join Hillary Clinton's presidential campaign as research director. Following the 2008 campaign, he practiced law in Maryland before returning to ThinkProgress in 2011, and became the site's editor-in-chief in May 2012. Under his supervision, the site grew up to a 40-person newsroom that earned 10 million unique visitors a month.

In 2010, Legum unsuccessfully ran for a seat in the Maryland House of Delegates.

Legum has drawn notice for reporting and commentary on a range of political topics, including the 2016 presidential campaign, campaign finance, the legacy of Martin Luther King in contemporary politics, and the media's role in politics.

In 2018, Legum announced he was leaving ThinkProgress to develop an independent newsletter, to be published through Substack. Legum joins Matt Taibbi and Daniel Lavery as early participants in the company's publishing model. Legum's newsletter, called "Popular Information", is Substack's first politically-focused publication. It launched July 23, 2018.

References

1978 births
Living people
American male journalists
Georgetown University Law Center alumni
American political journalists
American Internet company founders
Pomona College alumni